SLCD may stand for:

 Spring-loaded camming device, a rock climbing protection equipment
 Super LCD, a display technology used by numerous manufacturers for mobile device displays
 S-LCD Corporation, a South Korean manufacturer of device panels
 Cañada Airport, Bolivia, (ICAO code SLCD), an airport in the Santa Cruz Department of Bolivia
San Lorenzo College of Davao, an educational institution in Davao City, Philippines
Panasonic CD interface, also known as SLCD, an obsolete proprietary computer interface